A Shot at Glory is a film by Michael Corrente produced in 1999 and released in 2002, starring Robert Duvall and the Scottish football player Ally McCoist. It had limited commercial and critical success. The film features the fictional Scottish football club Kilnockie FC, based on a Second Division Scottish Football League club, as they attempt to reach their first ever Scottish Cup Final. The final game is against Rangers.

Plot
Robert Duvall plays the club manager, Gordon McLeod. Jackie McQuillan (Ally McCoist) is the team's striker, an ageing player on the verge of retirement, who has recently been signed from Arsenal. McQuillan is a legendary ex-Celtic player who, as well as being married to McLeod's daughter, has a reputation for being troublesome. The two men put their personal problems aside as they try to prevent the small fishing town of Kilnockie from losing its club, which is owned by an American businessman (played by Michael Keaton) who wants to move the club to Dublin in Ireland.

Cast
 Robert Duvall as Gordon McLeod
 Ally McCoist as Jackie McQuillan
 Michael Keaton as Peter Cameron
 Brian Cox as Martin Smith, Rangers manager
 Kirsty Mitchell as Kate McQuillan
 Bill Murdoch as Desmond
 Daniel Healy as Street Kid #2
 Ian McKellar as himself (Hampden crowd) 
 Kris Glasgow as himself (Hampden crowd) 
 Steven Glasgow as himself (Hampden Crowd) 
 Craig McIntosh as himself (Hampden crowd)
Ricky Cameron Kelly as himself (Hampden crowd)
Ryan Telford as himself (Hampden crowd)
 Andy McGeoch as Haddie the Haddock (Team Mascot)
 
Kilnockie Team
 Cole Hauser as Kelsey O'Brian
 Owen Coyle as himself
 Andy Smith as himself
 Steven Hamilton as himself
 Peter Hetherston as himself
 Craig McEwan as himself
 Kenny Black as himself

Queen of the South Team
 Ian McCall as Derek McCall

Rangers Team
 Darren Fitzgerald as himself
 Ally Maxwell as himself
 Derek Ferguson as himself
 Didier Agathe as himself
 Eddie May as himself

Production 
The film's working title was The Cup.

Filming took place at several locations across Scotland, including Boghead Park (the former ground of Dumbarton), Dumfries club Queen of the South's Palmerston Park ground, Kilmarnock's Rugby Park ground and Hampden Park. The majority of scenes representing the town of Kilnockie were filmed in Crail, Fife. Several extras in the film were then players of Raith Rovers, including future Celtic player Didier Agathe. Duvall regularly went to see Raith Rovers to learn from John McVeigh, the manager, on whom his character was based. The movie is loosely based on the cup exploits of Airdrieonians, who as a small town team reached two Scottish Cup Finals, several League Cup semi-finals, and qualified for the European Cup Winners Cup in the 1990s. John McVeigh was Assistant Manager at Airdrie when they enjoyed this success. The cast featured several past and current Airdrie players in both speaking and non speaking roles. Robert Duvall was impressed with Ally McCoist acting.

Former Celtic player Jimmy Johnstone and Rangers' Jim Baxter were among the star names who turned down roles in the film.

Reception
The film received mixed reviews.

See also
 A Shot at Glory (soundtrack)

References

External links

2002 films
2000s sports drama films
British sports drama films
Scottish films
British association football films
Films set in Scotland
Films shot in Scotland
2002 drama films
2000s English-language films
Films directed by Michael Corrente
2000s British films